Colondannes is a commune in the Creuse department in the Nouvelle-Aquitaine region in central France.

Geography

Population

Sights
 The church, dating from the twelfth century, houses some 18th-century frescoes. In the centre of the choir vault the dove of the Holy Spirit emerges from a radiant cloud. The four evangelists can be seen on the north and south walls of the vault. At the entrance to the choir at the north-west there is an image of St. Matthew soaking a pen in an inkwell held by an angel. To the north-east is Saint Luke in profile holding an inscribed phylactery and accompanied by an eagle. To the south-east we have St. Luke writing in a book and accompanied by his symbol, an ox. At the south-west we see St. Mark placing his left hand on a book and accompanied by his symbol, the lion. Under the blind arcade of the north chapel two Sacred Hearts inflamed and pierced by a dagger can be seen on a background of radiant clouds.

See also
Communes of the Creuse department

References

Communes of Creuse